There are many Grade II listed buildings in Bristol, United Kingdom.

In England and Wales the authority for listing is granted by the Planning (Listed Buildings and Conservation Areas) Act 1990 and is administered by English Heritage, an agency of the Department for Digital, Culture, Media and Sport.

In the United Kingdom the term "listed building" refers to a building or other structure officially designated as being of special architectural, historical or cultural significance.

A–C

D–H

I–R

R–Z

Notes 
Grid reference is based on the British national grid reference system, also known as OSGB36, and is the system used by the Ordnance Survey.
References are to the data sheets for each site on Images of England which is funded by English Heritage and the Heritage Lottery Fund, to create a 'point in time' photographic record of England's listed buildings. The list is of the buildings listed at the turn of the millennium; it is not an up-to-date record of all listed buildings. The listing status and descriptions shown on the Images of England website are the listings as at February 2001.

References

See also 

 Buildings and architecture of Bristol
 Grade I listed buildings in Bristol
 Grade II* listed buildings in Bristol

 
Bristol